The 2012 Internazionali Trofeo Lame Perrel–Faip was a professional tennis tournament played on hard courts. It was the seventh edition of the tournament which was part of the 2012 ATP Challenger Tour. It took place in Bergamo, Italy between 13 and 19 February 2012.

Singles main-draw entrants

Seeds

 1 Rankings are as of February 6, 2012.

Other entrants
The following players received wildcards into the singles main draw:
  Andrea Arnaboldi
  Benjamin Becker
  Marco Crugnola
  Claudio Grassi

The following players received entry as an alternate into the singles main draw:
  Amer Delić
  Martin Fischer

The following players received entry from the qualifying draw:
  Grégoire Burquier 
  Marius Copil
  Julien Dubail
  Albano Olivetti
  Maxime Authom (Lucky loser)

Champions

Singles

 Björn Phau def.  Alexander Kudryavtsev, 6–4, 6–4

Doubles

 Jamie Delgado /  Ken Skupski def.  Martin Fischer /  Philipp Oswald, 7–5, 7–5

External links
Official Website
ITF Search
ATP official site

Internazionali Trofeo Lame Perrel-Faip
Trofeo Faip–Perrel